The Rovers Comedy House is a Canadian variety television miniseries which aired on CBC Television in 1981.

Premise
The Irish Rovers, who identified as The Rovers in the early 1980s, hosted this Vancouver-produced music and comedy variety series. George Millar of the group likened the series to an "Irish Hee-Haw." The series was backed by CBC Television after The Rovers starred in a highly rated October 1980 broadcast. The series was produced in Vancouver by Ken Gibson and directed by Michael Watt. Irish singer Jimmy Kennedy regularly portrayed a bartender on the series.

Scheduling
This half-hour series was originally broadcast on Thursdays at 10:30 p.m. from 8 January to 19 February 1981. When a NABET strike affected the network that spring, the series was rebroadcast from 9 May to 13 June on Saturdays at 6:30 p.m., It was rebroadcast again in 1982, on Mondays at 7:30 p.m. from 24 to 31 May.

Episodes and guests

 8 January 1981 - Oscar Brand
 15 January 1981 - Tommy Makem and Liam Clancy
 22 January 1981 - Andy Stewart
 29 January 1981 - Dennis Day
 5 February 1981 - Jim Stafford
 12 February 1981 - Bruno Gerussi, Tommy Makem and Liam Clancy
 19 February 1981 - Bob Gibson, Shay Duffin

References

External links
 

CBC Television original programming
1981 Canadian television series debuts
1981 Canadian television series endings
1980s Canadian variety television series
1980s Canadian comedy television series